Kalampattu is a traditional performing art in Kerala, India.

It is performed as a vazhipad (offering). Pattu kurup, a traditional community, is in charge of that function. This offering is performed for the blessings of gods like Bhadrakali, Ayyappan, Vettakkorumakan, serpent god, etc. This kurup makes the kalam picture (drawn on the floor using five colours) and he sings also. The velichappad (Komaram) mostly belongs to the Nambudiri community does the kalapradikshinam (rounding the kalam with different steps and rhythms), nalikerameru (breaking of coconut as offering), and kalammakkal (validictory function – closing the function).

Items
Pattu Kurayidal: (official starting of the function) - The kurup with the suggestion of the offerer starts the programme with decorating the stage (mandapam or pattupura). Sometimes there may be a series of Paatt at the same mandapam. So the koora or the decoration will be removed only after the series. For example, nilampur paattu is of 41 days.
Kalam Puja: After decorating the mandapam a puja for the deity is done at that place and that puja will be completed only at the last stage of the patt of that day-just before kalam makkal (erasing the kalam). From that moment the presence of the deity is supposed at the mandapam. During the puja kurup sings some devotional songs (there are customary songs at each stage to sing)
Sandya Vela: This is after Deeparadhana, Keli, Thayampaka, Kushalpattu etc. are done according to the budget of the offerer. (SREE BHADRA KALI & KARIAM KALI MOORTHY DEVI) adoor, Malamekkara, PAthanamthitta are Tradicitinal Temple in Kerala.
Mullakka Pattu: During sandhyaavela the kurup will be making the kalam. He makes the customary picture of the deity with five colours: white, yellow, black, green and red. When the kalam is ready the deity and the komaram will be welcomed to the kalam as a procession. Here also according to the budget elephant, melam, and other decorative items can be added in the procession. Kallat Haridas Kurup S/o Kallat Achutha Kurup is one of the most famous artist in this field, from Chelakkara, Thozhupadam, Painkulam.
kalapradakshinam: Komaram rounds the kalam with different steps and rhythms. Edam thala (Drum's-left side), elathaalam (cymbals), kombu, kuzhal (trumpet) are the instruments at the time of Kalapradakshinam. After the Chembadavatta thaalam, Marar has to play the drums according to the steps of Komaram, while the komaram can perform with his skills and taste. This part of the function is led by the Komaram.
Nalikerameru (Breaking of coconut): t is an important function performed for Kalampattu except for Women-Deities (Goddesses). The number of breaking coconut ranges from 3 to 12008 (Pantheerayirathettu nalikeeramerru). Komaram erases the Kalam, while erasing the Kalam he breaks the required number of coconuts as offering in between till the erasing is completed.
As a part of Vettakorumakan pattu, 12008 coconut's are broken by komaram. Manikandan kallat, kattakampal is one of the famous in this field.

There are 29 different types of nagakalam (serpant kalam) by kallat stylein Mulluthara devi temple. in the present generation he was the only one in kallat kurup family who knows all different types of kalam. He learned this from his master Kallat Ravunni Kurup Nelluvai.
Different types of kalam, pictures, videos, and details are given in the site www.kalampattu.com

Kalamezhuthupattu:

Kalamezhuthupattu is a traditional performing art in Mulluthara devi temple Kerala, Adoor, Malamekkara. India. It is performed as a vazhipad (offering). Kallatt kurup, a traditional community, is in charge of that function. The Kalampattu is associated with some ritualistic dance performances. This offering is performed for the blessings of Gods like Bhadhrakali, Ayyappan, Vettakkorumakan, Serpent God, etc.
After Koorayidal and Uchappattu, Kurup does the Kalamezhuthu (drawn on the floor using five colours). Marar (who plays drums) does the Sandyavela after deeparadhana. Keli, thayampaka, kushalpattu, etc. are done according to the budget of the offerer. When the Kalam is ready, the Deity and the Komaram will be welcomed to the Kalam as a procession with a song by Kurup called Mullakkan pattu. Here also according to the budget elephant, melam, and other decorative items can be added to the procession. The Velichappad (Komaram) does the ritual dance known as Eedum koorum chavittu and the Kalapradakshinam (rounding the Kalam with different steps and rhythms). After the completion of Kalapradakshinam, the Brahmin priest is assigned the privilege of doing the Kalam pooja of the image before the onset of the Kalampattu. After that Kurup performs Thiriuzichil, the Komaram performs Kalathylattam, Nalikerameru (breaking of coconut as offering), and Kalam maykkal (Kalasam - valedictory function – closing the function). After that kurup remove the koora (Koora valikkal).

Kalam Ezhuthum Paattum at Arakkulangara Bhagavathy Temple in Kurumassery, near Kochi International Airport 
For centuries Kalam Ezhuthum Paattum is a traditional annual festival at Arakkulangara Bhagavathy temple, that happens from the First day of Makaram (6th month of Malayalam Era) every year. Here is the sample of the "Pooja", "Vaadyam" and "Paattu" rendering at Arakkulangara Bhagavathy Temple.

https://www.youtube.com/watch?v=GevXetl8qQ0
https://www.youtube.com/watch?v=RZixKDvihKE
https://www.youtube.com/watch?v=WgCW0vjSf24&t=20s

References

www.kalampattu.com
Devi Temple.com

External links

Devi Temple.com

Performing arts in India
Masterpieces of the Oral and Intangible Heritage of Humanity
Arts of Kerala
Religious vernacular drama